Udea vastalis is a moth in the family Crambidae. It was described by Hugo Theodor Christoph in 1887. It is found in Azerbaijan and Georgia.

References

vastalis
Moths described in 1887